Rayasam (Telugu: రాయసం) is an Indian surname. Notable people with the surname include:

 Beechi, born as Rayasam Bheemasena Rao (1913–1980), humorist in the Kannada language
 Rayasam Seshagiri Rao (1909-1963), member of the 1st Lok Sabha of India

Surnames of Indian origin